Gawne Nunatak is a nunatak on the east side of Wells Saddle between Mount Berlin and Mount Moulton in the Flood Range of Marie Byrd Land, Antarctica. It was mapped by the United States Geological Survey from surveys and U.S. Navy air photos, 1959–66, and was named by the Advisory Committee on Antarctic Names for Steven P. Gawne, a member of the United States Antarctic Research Program team that studied ice sheet dynamics in the area northeast of Byrd Station in the 1971–72 season.

References

Nunataks of Marie Byrd Land
Flood Range